Av Harachamim or Abh Haraḥamim ( "Father [of] mercy" or "Merciful Father") is a Jewish memorial prayer which was written in the late eleventh or early twelfth century, after the destruction of the Ashkenazi communities around the Rhine River by Christian crusaders during the First Crusade. First appearing in prayer books in 1290, it is printed in every  Orthodox siddur in the European traditions of Nusach Sefarad and Nusach Ashkenaz and recited as part of the weekly Shabbat services, or in some communities on the Shabbat before Shavuot and Tisha B'Av.

The Yizkor service on Jewish holidays concludes with the Av Harachamim, which prays for the souls of all Jewish martyrs.

Text

English
The Father of mercy who dwells on high
in His great mercy
will remember with compassion
the pious, upright and blameless
the holy communities, who laid down their lives 
for the sanctification of His name.
They were loved and pleasant in their lives
and in death they were not parted.
They were swifter than eagles and stronger than lions
to carry out the will of their Maker, 
and the desire of their steadfast God.
May our Lord remember them for good 
together with the other righteous of the world
and may He redress the spilled blood of His servants 
as it is written in the Torah of Moses the man of God:
"O nations, make His people rejoice
for He will redress the blood of His servants
He will retaliate against His enemies
and appease His land and His people".
And through Your servants, the prophets it is written:
"Though I forgive, their bloodshed I shall not forgive 
When God dwells in Zion"
And in the Holy Writings it says:
"Why should the nations say, 'Where is their God?'"
Let it be known among the nations in our sight 
that You avenge the spilled blood of Your servants.
And it says: "For He who exacts retribution for spilled blood 
remembers them
He does not forget the cry of the humble".
And it says:
"He will execute judgement among the corpse-filled nations
crushing the rulers of the mighty land;
from the brook by the wayside he will drink
then he will hold his head high".

Hebrew

Transliteration
Av harachameem shochein m'romeem, b'rachamav ha-atzumeem hu yeefkod b'rachamim. Hachaseedeem v'ha-y'shareem v'ha-t'meemeem, k'heelot hakodesh shemas'ru nafsham al kdushat Hasheim, hane-eh-haveem v'ha-n'eemeem b'chayeihem, uvmotam lo neefradu. Meen'shareem kalu umeiarayot gaveiru laasot r'tzon konam v'cheifetz tzuram. Yeezk'reim Eloheinu l'tova eem sh'ar tzadeekei olam v'yeenkom l'eineinu neekmat dam avadav hashafuch kakatuv b'torat moshe eesh haEloheem: harneenu goyeem amo kee dam avadav yeekom v'nakam yasheev l'tzarav v'cheeper admato amo. V'al y'dei avadecha haN'vee-eem katuv leimor: V'neekeitee damam lo neekeitee vAdonoy Shochein b'tzeeyon. Uvcheetvei hakodesh ne-eh-mar: lama yom'ru hagoyeem ayei ehloheihem yeevada bagoyeem l'eineinu neekmat dam avadecha hashafuch. V'omeir: kee doreish dameem otam zachar lo shachach tza-ah-kat anaveem. V'omeir: yadeen bagoyeem malei g'veeyot machatz rosh al eretz raba. Meenachal baderech yeeshte al kein yareem rosh.

Melodies

See also
 Martyrdom in Judaism
 Bereavement in Judaism
 Kaddish

References

External links
Yizkor article at Jewish Virtual Library

Bereavement in Judaism
Jewish prayer and ritual texts
Shacharit for Shabbat and Yom Tov
First Crusade
Medieval anti-Jewish pogroms
Hebrew words and phrases in Jewish prayers and blessings